Leitneria pugio is a species of mite in the family Halolaelapidae.

References

Acari